PFCA may refer to:

Biology 
 Protein-fragment complementation assay

Chemistry 
 Perfluorinated carboxylic acid

Sensing Technology 
 The Planar Fourier Capture Array, a tiny camera built entirely in standard CMOS